Felimida galexorum is a species of colourful sea slug, a dorid nudibranch, a marine gastropod mollusk in the family Chromodorididae.

Distribution
This species occurs in the Pacific Ocean from Catalina Island, California, USA to the Gulf of California, West Mexico

Description
The body reaches a length of 24 mm.

Ecology

References

 Rudman W.B. (1983) The Chromodorididae (Opisthobranchia: Mollusca) of the Indo-West Pacific: Chromodoris splendida, C. aspersa and Hypselodoris placida colour groups. Zoological Journal of the Linnean Society 78: 105-173. page(s): 167
 Debelius, H. & Kuiter, R.H. (2007) Nudibranchs of the world. ConchBooks, Frankfurt, 360 pp.  page(s): 165 
 Behrens D.W., Gosliner T.M. & Hermosillo A. (2009) A new species of dorid nudibranch (Mollusca) from the Revillagigedo Islands of the Mexican Pacific. Proceedings of the California Academy of Sciences ser. 4, 60(11): 423-429.
 Johnson R.F. & Gosliner T.M. (2012) Traditional taxonomic groupings mask evolutionary history: A molecular phylogeny and new classification of the chromodorid nudibranchs. PLoS ONE 7(4): e33479

Chromodorididae
Gastropods described in 1978